Blair Athol or variation, may refer:

Places
 Australia
Blair Athol, New South Wales, Australia
Blair Athol, Queensland, Australia
Blair Athol, South Australia, Australia

 Scotland
Blair Atholl, Perth and Kinross, Scotland, UK
 Blair Atholl railway station
Blair Athol distillery in Pitlochry, Scotland, UK

Other uses
Blair Athol (horse) was a British racehorse that won the 1864 Epsom Derby
Blair of Athol (ship), a Canadian ship operating in Yukon and British Columbia; see List of historical ships in British Columbia and List of steamboats on the Yukon River

See also

 Blair (disambiguation)
 Athol (disambiguation)
 Atholl (disambiguation)